The Samakh raid was fought in April 1920 between Arab Bedouin irregulars under the banner of the Arab Kingdom of Syria and the British Army in Eastern Galilee. The event is perceived by scholars as part of the spillover of the Franco-Syrian War.

Background
The Franco-Syrian War took place in early 1920 between Syrian Arab nationalists, under the Hashemite King, and France. Gangs ('isabat) of clan-based border peasants, combining politics and banditry, were active in the area of the loosely defined border between the soon to be established Mandatory Palestine, French Mandate of Lebanon and Syria.

Timeline
At the beginning of the Franco-Syrian War, the Upper Galilee was populated by several semi-nomadic Bedouin Arab tribes, the largest residing in Halasa, and four tiny Jewish settlements, including Metula, Kfar Giladi, Tel Hai and Hamra. While the Arab villages and Bedouin allied with the Arab Kingdom of Syria, the Jewish residents chose to remain neutral during the Arab conflict with the French.

Just prior to the French occupation of Damascus, the instability in Transjordan threatened to spill over into Palestine. The sedentary clans of Bani Kananah, perhaps encouraged by members of the Istiqlal native to the Hawran, including such radical nationalists as Ahmad Muraywid and Ali Khulqi raided Jewish settlements in Galilee. Early in the war, a Kfar Giladi resident was killed by armed Bedouin, greatly increasing tension in the region. Jewish villages were regularly pillaged by the pro-Syrian Bedouin on the pretext of searching for French spies and soldiers.

In April 1920, the Arab militants engaged British Army at Samakh and suffered a number of casualties as RAF planes strafed them on their way back across the Jordan river. The event took place as some 2,000 armed Bedouins mostly from Transjordan attempted to attack the Samakh train station aiming to prevent the arrival of British reinforcements from Haifa.

Consequences
The Samakh raid seemed to confirm Allenby's fears that abandonment of OETA East would leave Palestine's right flank "in the air, threatened by all the Druze and bedouin tribes." Herbert Samuel, the high commissioner in Jerusalem, called for the occupation of Transjordan west of the Hijaz Railway.

See also 
 Sykes-Picot Agreement
 1936–39 Arab revolt in Palestine
 Battle of Samakh

References

1920 in Mandatory Palestine
Samakh
1920s in Transjordan